B.P.R.D. Hell on Earth: Gods and Monsters is the second trade paperback collection in the Hell on Earth cycle of the B.P.R.D. series.

Story

Gods: Chapter 1

Gods: Chapter 2

Gods: Chapter 3

Monsters: Chapter 1

Monsters: Chapter 2

References

Fantasy comics